The National People's Concern Party was a political party in Indonesia, headed by Amelia Achmad Yani, daughter of General Ahmad Yani. It contested the 2009 elections, but won only 1.2 percent of the vote, less than the 2.5 percent electoral threshold, so gained no seats in the People's Representative Council. The party intended to contest the 2014 elections, but failed to fulfil the ctteria set by the General Elections Commission, and along with nine other parties who also failed to qualify, decided to merge into the People's Conscience Party (Hanura).

References

Pancasila political parties
Political parties in Indonesia